"The World Is a Wedding" is a short story by Delmore Schwartz.

Bibliography

External links 

 

American short stories
Jewish American literature